IBSA Africa Goalball Championships is one of the four competition regions used for World Championships and Paralympic Games qualification for goalball, a team sport for the vision-impaired.

Hostings

2010 Port Said 

The 2010 IBSA Goalball African Championships was held in Port Said, Egypt.  Final ranked teams were:

Men: Algeria, Morocco, Egypt, Kenya, Libya.

2011 Sydney 

The team competed in a composite tournament, the 2011 IBSA African-Oceania Regional Championships, with games from 15 to 17 November 2011, at the Sydney Olympic Park Sports Centre, Sydney, Australia.  Although the four regions under the rules were Africa, America, Asia/Pacific, and Europe, as there were insufficient competitive teams in both Africa and Oceania regions, IBSA agreed to combined championships.

For the women's teams, it was only Australia versus New Zealand, the winner qualifying for the London 2012 Paralympic Games.  From the best of three games, Australia dominated and qualified.

For the men's teams, Algeria beat Australia, who in turn, had beaten New Zealand.  Algeria went onto the Paralympic Games.

2013 Nairobi 

The 2013 IBSA Goalball African Championships was held in Nairobi, Kenya  Final ranked teams were:

Men:  Algeria, Morocco, Egypt, Kenya, Rwanda, Ghana.

2016 Algiers 

The 2016 IBSA Goalball African Championships was held in Algiers, Algeria, from 27 February to 5 March 2016. Final ranked teams were:

Men: Algeria, Egypt, Morocco, Tunisia, Côte d'Ivoire.

Women: Algeria, Egypt, Morocco, Tunisia.

2017 Sharm el Sheikh 

The 2017 IBSA Goalball African Championships was held in Sharm el Sheikh, Egypt, from 14 to 24 October 2017. Final ranked teams were:

Men: Algeria, Egypt, Morocco, Rwanda, Kenya.

Women: Algeria, Egypt, Kenya.

2020 Port Said 

The 2020 IBSA Goalball African Championships was held in Port Said, Egypt.  Because neither division had the minimum four competing teams, this was a regional tournament, not the regional championships.  Final ranked teams were:

Men: Algeria, Egypt, Morocco.

Women: Algeria, Egypt, Morocco.

African Championships results

Men

Women

References 

Goalball competitions
National goalball teams
National men's goalball teams
National women's goalball teams
Goalball in Africa